Chir or CHIR may refer to:

Places

Algeria
 Chir, Algeria

Iran
 Chir, Bavanat, Fars
 Chir, Mamasani, Fars
 Chir, Kohgiluyeh and Boyer-Ahmad
 Chir, West Azerbaijan
 Chavor, Zanjan Province, also known as Chīr
 Cher, Iran, also known as Chīr

Russia
 Chir (river), a tributary of the Don in Russia

Species
 Chir pine (Pinus roxburghii), a species of pine tree in the Himalayas
 Broad whitefish (Coregonus nasus), also known as Chir, a species of freshwater whitefish in the arctic and subarctic regions of Russia, United States, and Canada

Other uses
 CHIR, the former call sign of Canadian radio station CHYR-FM
 Chir Batti, a ghost light reported in the Banni grasslands near the India–Pakistan border

See also

Chic (disambiguation)
Chik (disambiguation)
 Chira (disambiguation)